Grachyovsky District is the name of several administrative and municipal districts in Russia.
Grachyovsky District, Orenburg Oblast, an administrative and municipal district of Orenburg Oblast
Grachyovsky District, Stavropol Krai, an administrative and municipal district of Stavropol Krai

See also
Grachyovsky (disambiguation)

References